Hockey Club Morzine-Avoriaz(HCMA), also known as , is a French ice hockey team based in Morzine. They currently play in Division 1, having last played in the Ligue Magnus in the 2015/2016 season.

History
The team was founded in 1963. They merged with Chamonix HC to form Pionniers De Chamonix-Morzine in 2016, a partnership that ended in 2017 with a return to Division 3 for HCMA.

Stadium
The team plays home games at the Škoda Arena.

Coaches
 Stéphane Gros

Former players

 Romain Bonnefond
 Benjamin Dieu de Fauvel
 Laurent Gras
 Julien Lebey
 Florian Hardy
 Maxime Michaud
 Mathieu Mille
 Nicolas Pousset
 Jonathan Zwikel

 Mika Halava
 Toni Kluuskeri
 Antti Koponen

Logos

References

External links
 Official website 

Ice hockey teams in France
Sport in Haute-Savoie
Ice hockey clubs established in 1963
1963 establishments in France